Tuczno Drugie  is a village in the administrative district of Gmina Tuczno, within Wałcz County, West Pomeranian Voivodeship, in north-western Poland.

The village has a population of 30.

Between 1871 and 1945 the area was part of Germany.

References

Tuczno Drugie